Old Customshouse is a historic custom house located at Erie, Erie County, Pennsylvania. It was built in 1838–1839, and is a two-story, brick and Vermont marble rectangular building. The front facade features a pedimented portico with six two-story, Doric order columns in the Greek Revival style. The building housed the post office until 1867, served as the Customs House for the port of Erie from 1849 to 1888, and later housed a Grand Army of the Republic post and the Erie County Historical Society.  It is now part of a five-building complex of the Erie Art Museum.

It was added to the National Register of Historic Places in 1972.

References

External links

 Old Customs House, 415 State Street, Erie, Erie County, PA: 5 photos, 14 measured drawings, and 4 data pages, at Historic American Buildings Survey

Historic American Buildings Survey in Pennsylvania
Government buildings on the National Register of Historic Places in Pennsylvania
Greek Revival architecture in Pennsylvania
Government buildings completed in 1839
Buildings and structures in Erie, Pennsylvania
National Register of Historic Places in Erie County, Pennsylvania